Harold Taylor is a politician in Manitoba, Canada.  He was a member of the Legislative Assembly of Manitoba from 1988 to 1990, representing the riding of Wolseley for the Manitoba Liberal Party.

In 1983 and 1986, he was elected to the Winnipeg City Council in the Memorial district, as an independent candidate supporting the Liberal Party.

Taylor was elected to the Manitoba legislature in the 1988 provincial election, defeating incumbent New Democrat Myrna Phillips by 506 votes.  The Liberals increased their parliamentary strength from one to twenty in this election, and Taylor sat with the official opposition for the next two years.  In the 1990 provincial election, he lost to NDP candidate Jean Friesen by 1045 votes.

Taylor subsequently became involved in water conservation, serving as Executive Director of the Red River Basin Commission. He has also worked on the Pembina River Basin Advisory Board and the Water Strategy Advisory Committee.

Election results

References

Legislative Assembly of Manitoba. Tuesday, December 14, 1999 Under "Introduction of Guests", mentions "we have with us today Harold Taylor, former MLA for Wolseley."

Manitoba Liberal Party MLAs
Winnipeg city councillors
Living people
Year of birth missing (living people)